The Baining languages are a small language family spoken by the Baining people on the Gazelle Peninsula of New Britain in Papua New Guinea. They appear to be related to the neighboring Taulil–Butam languages, which immigrated from New Ireland.

Languages
The languages are:
Mali (2,200 speakers)
Qaqet (6,400 speakers)
Kairak (900 speakers)
Simbali (450 speakers)
Ura (1,900 speakers)

Extinct Makolkol neighbored the (other) Baining languages to their southwest but is unattested.

Vocabulary comparison
The following basic vocabulary words are from SIL field notes (1970, 1971, 1975), as cited in the Trans-New Guinea database:

{| class="wikitable sortable"
! gloss !! Mali (Makunga dialect) !! Mali (Arambum dialect) !! Qaget !! Ura
|-
! head
| aŋʌpʌski || uwʌski || niŋaǥa; ʌ niŋʌg̶ʌ || amʌ niŋʌɣi; auwʌski; ʌmʌ niŋʌɣɩ
|-
! hair
| aɣʌsɛŋ || ǥʌsɛŋ || aǥsiŋ; ʌg̶asiŋ || aɣʌsɛŋ; kʌsiŋ; kʌsɩŋ
|-
! ear
| sʌdᶺm || asdɛmgi || asndəmgi; sədəmki || asdʌmgi; dʌsdəmgɩ; dʌsdəmgi
|-
! eye
| saǥɔŋ || saǥoŋ || ʌ rʌsʌkŋiʌm; saknaǥa || asauɣoŋ; ʌ̂ sʌǥon; ʌ sʌǥoŋ
|-
! nose
| kulimki || ulɩmgi || ǥəřɩmki; ʌ rʌg̶ʌrimgi || awʌlyʌmgi; ʌ ǥulimgɩ; ʌ ǥulimgi
|-
! tooth
| alkɛŋ || ǥɛŋ || ařkiŋ; ařkingi || atkiŋgi; ʌ ǥʌřʌ; naeyɛŋ; næyɛŋ
|-
! tongue
| aǥulbiŋka || ǥɔbɩnga || ǥalbinka; og̶lbinga || aɣuebunga; duɛbingʌ
|-
! leg
| alaǥar; səlʌpiřom || aǥař || ʌ laiŋyat; ɩlaiŋ || ʌgʌřʌ
|-
! louse
| tʌƀəřʌk || it || ᶩait; ʌ ɛɛtki || məaιt; məait; ɩr̰aɩt
|-
! dog
| paimka || imga || daŋka; ʌ dʌŋgʌ || imga; mɛmgʌ
|-
! pig
| ƀlam; pᶺlᶺmkah || ƀɛmgah || ƀiləmgʌ; ƀlam || ƀɩɛmgʌ; ƀiɛmgʌ; wemga
|-
! bird
| isᶺmka || i sʌmga || waiṱki; ʌ wʌitka || ɛɛ'sumgʌ; ɛɛsumgʌ; isʌmga
|-
! egg
| pa·lo || la || luaǥa; ʌ luʌg̶ʌ || duřaiṱ; duřaιt̯; luaɣa
|-
! blood
| ambias || abiʌska || ʌg̶ʌřʌkʌ; ǥəřəka || a biaska; biʌskʌ
|-
! bone
| səlʌp || atlɨp || lan; sləpki || a Lləp; ʌ Lləp; o slʌpki
|-
! skin
| kᶺndʌnki || ŋᶺndᶺŋ || ǥət·dinki; ʌrʌgʌtdəŋit || aslɩɣɩge; ʌ sliyɩgɛ; ʌ sliyigɛ
|-
! breast
| kʌmkʌ || ǥumukh || ǥomʌk; og̶əmək || at gəmuk; atkʌmuk
|-
! tree
| amʌŋka || ŋumuŋ || mʌŋkha; munkʌ || ʌ muŋgʌ; ŋʌmuga
|-
! man
| aroǥa; umᶺska || umʌska || ǥwatka; ʌ g̶wʌtkʌ || gamoɛɣa; gʌmuɛgʌ
|-
! woman
| lɛƀɔpki || aƀopəkin || nanki; ʌ nʌngi || ɛwəpkɩ; ɛwəpki; Ewopki
|-
! sun
| kunʌŋka || wunɛŋga || ʌ niřag̶a; niřaǥa; nɩlaǥa || ɣunʌga; wunʌgʌ
|-
! moon
| ayaƀunki || 'aǥɔngi || yaǥunki; ʌ yɔg̶ungi || yaǥunǥɩ; yaɣungi; yʌǥungi
|-
! water
| ařɛŋki || řiŋgi || ǥřapki; ʌ kʌinʌg̶i || mʌřiŋgi; mʌřɩŋgɩ; rigi
|-
! fire
| a mundʌm || mudʌmbʌs || altiŋki; ʌltiŋgi || mundʌbʌs; mundʌm
|-
! stone
| dulki || diǥa || ʌ dulkʌ; dulka || duɩɣa; mʌ duɩ; mʌ dui
|-
! road, path
| aiskah || iskah || aiskʌ; aiska || iska; mʌiskʌ; mʌɩskʌ
|-
! name
| aŋařɛpki || ŋʌrɩpkih || dyiʌringi namgi; řɨnki || diŋyiřipki; diŋyɩrɩpkɩ; ŋʌr̰iþki
|-
! eat
| katɨs || katɨs || ka tɨs; kʌ təs || ɣat tʌs; ka ts; kʌ təs
|-
! one
| asʌŋgʌk || sɛgɨkh || ǥwanaska; og̶unʌskʌ || sɩgʌk; sʌgʌk; sigʌk
|-
! two
| aundom || udion || ǥwanasiam; og̶unʌsiʌm || undiom; undɩom
|}

References

 
East New Britain languages
Languages of East New Britain Province